Cristofani is an Italian surname that may refer to
Bob Cristofani (1920–2002), Australian cricketer
Leonora Fani (born Eleonora Cristofani in 1954), Italian film actress
Mauro Cristofani (1941–1997), Italian linguist and researcher in Etruscan studies

Italian-language surnames
Patronymic surnames
Surnames from given names